First Baptist Church is a historic Southern Baptist church located at Middle Street and Church Alley in New Bern, Craven County, North Carolina.  It was built in 1848, and is a rectangular brick church building in the Gothic Revival style.  It features a two-stage, turreted entrance tower.

It was listed on the National Register of Historic Places in 1972.

References

Baptist churches in North Carolina
Churches in New Bern, North Carolina
Churches on the National Register of Historic Places in North Carolina
Gothic Revival church buildings in North Carolina
Churches completed in 1848
19th-century Baptist churches in the United States
National Register of Historic Places in Craven County, North Carolina
Southern Baptist Convention churches